is a Japanese voice actor who is affiliated with Arts Vision.

Filmography

Anime

2000 
 Inuyasha (Yoro Kita)

2002 
 Princess Tutu (Lysander)
 Naruto (Teuchi)

2003 
 Wolf's Rain (Soldier)
 Gad Guard (Haneke)
 DC Da Capo (Jungle Ranger No. 4)
 Fullmetal Alchemist (Guards)

2004 
 Ghost in the Shell: Stand Alone Complex 2nd GIG (Personal Ranger)
 Paranoia Agent (Takenori Kumakura)
 Mars Daybreak (People)
 Samurai Champloo (Owner, Ekiden Samurai)
Tweeny Witches (Hydra)
 Fafner (Fishmonger)
 Bleach (Shinigami)

2005 
 Pandalian (Wang)
 Kaiketsu Zorori (Clown, Daikonzame, Mekaburu)
 Fushigiboshi no Futago Hime (Kujira Santa)
 Emma: A Victorian Romance Second Act (Attendant)

2006 
 Tactical Roar (Sailor)
 Kage Kara Mamoru! (Tokage Seijin buka)
 Fushigiboshi no Futago Hime Gyu! (TV)
 When They Cry - Higurashi no Naku Koroni (Caster)
 Inukami! (Man)
 Shonen Onmyouji (Taifu no Kimi)
 Ghost Slayers Ayashi (Father of Central Thickness)

2007 
 Naruto: Shippuden (Teuchi)
 Oh! Edo Rocket (Ude)

2008 
 Allison & Lillia (Welch chief conductor)
 Soul Eater (Failure)
 Little Village People (Taichi Shuubu)

2011 
 Yondemasuyo, Azazel-san. Z (Andainpapa, Kuroiwa sensei)

2012 
 Rock Lee no Seishun Full-Power Ninden (Teuchi)
 Robotics;Notes (Announcer/Driver)

2016 
 Yo-kai Watch (Jerry)

Movies
 Naruto Shippuden the Movie: The Will of Fire (Teuchi)

Video games

2004 
 Fullmetal Alchemist: Dream Carnival (Customers)

2005 
 SHINSENGUMI ~Bakumatsu Gensou Ren'ai Kitan~ (Kinetaro Itou)
 Rogue Galaxy (Dario)

2006 
 Samurai Champloo: Samurai Action HIPHOP
 Blue Dragon (My Eventful)

2008 
 Sonic Unleashed

Dubbing

Live-action
 The Dilemma (Nick Brannen (Kevin James))

Animation
 Chicken Little (Runt of the Litter)

References

External links
Official agency profile 

Living people
Japanese male voice actors
Japanese male video game actors
Year of birth missing (living people)
20th-century Japanese male actors
21st-century Japanese male actors
Arts Vision voice actors